The area that was formerly known as Dagang District (literally as "The Big Port") lies at the southeast of Tianjin municipality area.

Established in 1979, Dagang has developed a foundation of petroleum chemistry and hosts Dagang Oilfield within its border. In November 2009 Binhai New Area was consolidated into a district, and the former subordinate districts of Tanggu, Hangu and Dagang were abolished.

Climate

References

External links
 Official site (Chinese and English)

Districts of Tianjin
1972 establishments in China
2009 disestablishments in China